The second season of The Crown follows the life and reign of Queen Elizabeth II. It consists of ten episodes and was released by Netflix on 8 December 2017.

Claire Foy stars as Elizabeth, with main cast members Matt Smith, Vanessa Kirby, Jeremy Northam, Greg Wise, Victoria Hamilton, Alex Jennings and Lia Williams reprising their roles from the first season. Anton Lesser and Matthew Goode are added to the main cast. Original main cast members Jared Harris, John Lithgow, and Ben Miles also return in cameo appearances.

Premise 
The Crown traces the life of Queen Elizabeth II from her wedding in 1947 through to the present day. Season two covers the period between 1956 and 1964. 

Claire Foy continues to portray the Queen, and the season covers the Suez Crisis in 1956, the retirement of the Queen's third Prime Minister Harold Macmillan in 1963, following the Profumo affair political scandal, and the births of the Queen’s two youngest children – Prince Andrew in 1960 and Prince Edward in 1964. The season also portrays John F. Kennedy, Jackie Kennedy and Lord Altrincham.

Cast

Main 

 Claire Foy as Queen Elizabeth II
 Matt Smith as Prince Philip, Duke of Edinburgh, Elizabeth's husband
 Vanessa Kirby as Princess Margaret, Countess of Snowdon, Elizabeth's younger sister
 Jeremy Northam as Prime Minister Anthony Eden
 Anton Lesser as Harold Macmillan, Anthony Eden's successor as Prime Minister
 Greg Wise as Lord Mountbatten, Philip's ambitious uncle and great-grandson of Queen Victoria
 Victoria Hamilton as Queen Elizabeth The Queen Mother, King George VI's widow and Elizabeth's mother
 Matthew Goode as Antony Armstrong-Jones, a society photographer who marries Princess Margaret

Featured
The following actors are credited in the opening titles of up to two episodes:
 Alex Jennings as Prince Edward, Duke of Windsor, formerly King Edward VIII, who abdicated in favour of his younger brother in order to marry Wallis Simpson
 Lia Williams as Wallis, Duchess of Windsor, the Duke of Windsor's American wife
 John Heffernan as Lord Altrincham, a writer who pens a scathing criticism of the Queen
 Gemma Whelan as Patricia Campbell, a secretary who works with Altrincham and types up his editorial; later Lord Altrincham's wife
 Paul Sparks as Billy Graham, a prominent American preacher with whom Elizabeth consults
 Jared Harris as King George VI, Elizabeth's father, known to his family as Bertie
 John Lithgow as Winston Churchill, the Queen's first Prime Minister
 Ben Miles as Group Captain Peter Townsend, George VI's former equerry and Princess Margaret's ex-fiancé
 Michael C. Hall as John F. Kennedy, 35th President of the United States
 Jodi Balfour as Jacqueline Kennedy, the First Lady of the United States
 Burghart Klaußner as Dr Kurt Hahn, the founder of Gordonstoun school
 Finn Elliot as school-aged Prince Philip
 Julian Baring as school-aged Prince Charles

Recurring 

 Will Keen as Michael Adeane, Private Secretary to the Queen 
 Daniel Ings as Mike Parker, Private Secretary to the Duke of Edinburgh 
 Chloe Pirrie as Eileen Parker, wife of Mike Parker 
 Pip Torrens as Tommy Lascelles, Former Private Secretary to the Queen  
 Billy Jenkins as Prince Charles, Elizabeth and Philip's eldest child and the heir apparent 
 Harry Hadden-Paton as Martin Charteris, Assistant Private Secretary to the Queen  
 Clive Francis as Lord Salisbury, Leader of the House of Lords 
 Nicholas Burns as Anthony Nutting, Minister of State for Foreign Affairs 
 Lizzy McInnerny as Bobo MacDonald, Principal Dresser to the Queen 
 Lucy Russell as Lady Mountbatten, wife of Lord Mountbatten and Prince Philip's maternal aunt by marriage 
 George Asprey as Walter Monckton, Minister of Defence 
 Richard Elfyn as Selwyn Lloyd, Foreign Secretary; later Chancellor of the Exchequer 
 Michael Culkin as Rab Butler, Deputy Prime Minister of the United Kingdom 
 Adrian Lukis as Vice-Admiral Conolly Abel Smith 
 Sophie Leigh Stone as Princess Alice, Philip's mother 
 Guy Williams as Prince Andrew, Philip's father 
 Leonie Benesch as Princess Cecile, Philip's sister 
 Simon Paisley Day as Meryn Lewis 
 Andy Sanderson as Prince Henry, Duke of Gloucester, Elizabeth II's paternal uncle 
 Mark Tandy as Cecil Beaton, Court Photographer to the British Royal Family 
 Sylvestra Le Touzel as Lady Dorothy Macmillan, Harold Macmillan's wife 
 Catherine Bailey as Elizabeth Cavendish, Lady-in-waiting to Princess Margaret 
 Joseph Kloska as Porchey, Horse Racing Manager to the Queen 
 Paul Clayton as Bob Boothby, Former Parliamentary Secretary to the Ministry of Food 
 Yolanda Kettle as Camilla Fry, Jeremy's wife 
 Ed Cooper Clarke as Jeremy Fry, Camilla's husband 
 Alice Hewkin as Jacqui Chan, Tony Armstrong-Jones's ex-girlfriend 
 Ryan Sampson as Dudley Moore, English actor, comedian, musician and composer 
 Tim Steed as John Profumo, Secretary of State for War 
 Lyla Barrett-Rye as school-aged Princess Anne, Elizabeth and Philip's second child and only daughter 
 Robert Irons as Freddie Bishop 
 Patrick Warner as Peter Cook, English comedian 
 James Laurenson as Doctor Weir, Physician to the Queen 
 Oliver Maltman as Jim Orr, Private Secretary to the Duke of Edinburgh 
 David Annen as Alec Douglas-Home, Foreign Secretary; later Prime Minister of the United Kingdom 
 Richard Lintern as Stephen Ward, English osteopath and artist who was one of the central figures in the 1963 Profumo affair 
 Gala Gordon as Christine Keeler, English model and showgirl 
 Grace and Amelia Gilmour as young Princess Anne (uncredited)

Guest 

 Amir Boutrous as President Nasser, President of Egypt 
 Julius D'Silva as Baron Nahum, Court Photographer to the British Royal Family 
 Patrick Ryecart as The Duke of Norfolk, Earl Marshal 
 Anna Madeley as Clarissa Eden, Anthony Eden's wife (and Sir Winston Churchill's niece) 
 Tom Durant-Pritchard as Billy Wallace, Princess Margaret's close friend
 Pip Carter as Colin Tennant, Lady Anne Tennant's husband  
 Grace Stone as Lady Anne Tennant, Colin Tennant's wife (and Princess Margaret's lady-in-waiting) 
 Abigail Parmenter as Judy Montagu 
 Josh Taylor as Johnny Dalkeith, nephew of the Duchess of Gloucester 
 Jo Herbert as Mary Charteris, Martin Charteris's wife 
 Anna Chancellor as The Countess of Rosse, Antony Armstrong-Jones's mother
 Danny Sapani as Kwame Nkrumah, the President of Ghana 
 Richard Clifford as Norman Hartnell, Royal Warrant as Dressmaker to the Queen 
 Sam Crane as Patrick Plunket, Deputy Master of the Royal Household 
 Julian Ovenden as Robert F. Kennedy, the 64th United States Attorney General and President John F. Kennedy's brother 
 August Wittgenstein as Georg Donatus, Hereditary Grand Duke of Hesse, Philip's brother-in-law 
 Eliza Sodró as Princess Sophie, Philip's fourth sister 
 Clare Holman as Princess Marina, Duchess of Kent, paternal aunt-by-marriage of Elizabeth, first cousin of Prince Philip and widow of Prince George, Duke of Kent

Episodes

Release 
The second season was released on Netflix worldwide in its entirety on 8 December 2017. Season two was released on DVD and Blu-ray in the United Kingdom on 22 October 2018 and worldwide on 13 November 2018.

Music

Reception 
Rotten Tomatoes reported a 89% approval rating for the second season based on 83 reviews, with an average rating of 8.30/10. The website's critical consensus read "The Crown continues its reign with a self-assured sophomore season that indulges in high drama and sumptuous costumes." On Metacritic, the second season holds a score of 87 out of 100, based on 27 critics, retaining the first season's indication of "universal acclaim".

Foy and Smith both earned significant praise from critics. Chancellor Agard of Entertainment Weekly wrote "As always, Claire Foy turns in an amazingly restrained performance." Reviewing the first episode, Gabriel Tate of The Daily Telegraph wrote that Foy and Smith have "seldom been better". Hugo Rifkind of The Times said "While ardent monarchists might bristle at the way this is going, for the rest of us it's getting better and better".

Alison Keene of Collider said "each new episode makes its mark and tells its own complete story... It's another exceptionally strong season of television, full of compelling drama and sweeping grandeur". Krutika Malikarjuna of TV Guide argued that the public is attracted to the royals' celebrity and star power, and said: "The brilliance of this framing becomes clear as the show evolves into The Real Housewives of Buckingham." Sophie Gilbert wrote for The Atlantic that the portrayal of a monarch who "would rather be living any other life" is "riveting", and that it is "gorgeously shot, with flawless re-creations of everything from the Throne Room in Buckingham Palace to a 1950s hospital ward. And it's surprisingly funny."

The Wall Street Journal critic John Anderson said "The Crown attains genuine sexiness without sex. Margaret, à la Ms. Kirby's interpretation, smolders, as does Elizabeth, at least on occasion." Meghan O'Keefe of Decider wrote that the season "continues to romanticize the British royal family, but the romance comes from how they're normal, not divine".

Less complimentary reviews saw the season criticised for what some regarded as failing to meet the emotional intensity of the first. John Doyle wrote for Globe and Mail that despite being  "lavishly made" and "breathtaking", it "now leans toward a three-hanky weeper about marriage. It is less than it was, like the monarchy itself, and of interest to monarchy fans only." Alan Sepinwall of Uproxx added "Many of the season's wounds are self-inflicted" and that Philip "still comes across as a whiny man-child". Phil Owen of The Wrap described the season as "trashy" and saw dry comedy in Northam's portrayal of Eden:  "I'm assuming that creator Peter Morgan meant for it to be comedy. There's really no other explanation for why Jeremy Northam played Prime Minister Anthony Eden like he's having a nervous breakdown in every scene."

Claire Foy won the 2018 Primetime Emmy Award for Outstanding Lead Actress in a Drama Series for her performance in the episode "Dear Mrs. Kennedy." Stephen Daldry won the 2018 Primetime Emmy Award for Outstanding Directing for a Drama Series for the episode "Paterfamilias."

References

External links
 
 

2017 American television seasons
2017 British television seasons
2